Vojislav Ilić Mlađi (7 October 1877 – 22 May 1944) was a Serbian writer and poet.

Biography
He is often mistaken with the 19th-century Serbian poet Vojislav Ilić to whom he was not related although for a time they lived near each other in the part of Belgrade called Palilula. Due to their same name, surname and even the same middle initial and out of respect to the older Ilić, he added the title of Mlađi (the Younger) to his name.

Selected works
Noćna svirka
Iz jedne šetnje
Zvoni
Sveti Sava
Kako umire Dalmatinac
Zavetna želja dr Rajsa
Inscription on the Mausoleum at Zeitenlik

References

1877 births
1944 deaths
Writers from Požarevac
Serbian male writers
Serbian male poets
Serbian World War I poets
Belgrade Higher School alumni
University of Belgrade Faculty of Law alumni
Burials at Belgrade New Cemetery
Yugoslav writers